According to Sanders (1960) there were eight certain or probable English feudal baronies in Devonshire:
Feudal barony of Bampton
Feudal barony of Bradninch
Feudal barony of Great Torrington
Feudal barony of Okehampton
Feudal barony of Totnes
Feudal barony of Barnstaple
Feudal barony of Berry Pomeroy
Feudal barony of Plympton

Writing in the early 17th century William Pole stated that there were an additional four feudal baronies: Dartington, Harberton, Bishop of Exeter, Abbot of Tavistock

See also
Feudal baronies in Cornwall

References

Sources
Sanders, I.J. English Baronies: A Study of their Origin and Descent 1086-1327, Oxford, 1960
Pole, Sir William (d.1635), Collections Towards a Description of the County of Devon, Sir John-William de la Pole (ed.), London, 1791, Book I,  pp.1-33
Risdon, Tristram (d.1640), Survey of Devon, 1811 edition, London, 1811, with 1810 Additions, pp.361-4, The Baronies of this County and how many Knight's Fees were held of the Honours, with the Ensigns of their Ancient Owners

History of Devon
Honours (feudal barony)
Feudal baronies in Devon